Hee-joon, also spelled Hee-jun, is a Korean unisex given name. Its meaning depends on the hanja used to write each syllable of the name. There are 24 hanja with the reading "hee" and 34 hanja with the reading "joon" on the South Korean government's official list of hanja which may be registered for use in given names.

People with this name include:
Lee Hee-joon (born 1979), South Korean actor
Moon Hee-joon (born 1978), South Korean singer, member of boy band H.O.T.
Heejun Han (born 1989), South Korean-born American singer and contestant on American Idol

See also
List of Korean given names

References

Korean unisex given names